LP 816-60 is a single red dwarf star of spectral type M4, located in constellation Capricornus at 18.6 light-years from Earth.

History of observations
The discovery name of this star is LP 816-60, which indicates that its discovery was published between 1963 and 1981 in University of Minnesota, Minneapolis.

LP 816-60 is known at least from 1979, when it was included to Luyten's catalogue NLTT.

Physical properties
No massive planets were detected around LP 816-60 as in 2013. The star has a magnetic starspot cycle of 10.6 years, and weak magnetic fields in chromosphere averaging 4.4 G.

References

Capricornus (constellation)
M-type main-sequence stars
J20523304-1658289
Ursa Major Moving Group
103039